This article contains a list of notable mnemonics used to remember various objects, lists, etc.

Astronomy

Order of planets from the Sun: (Mercury, Venus, Earth, Mars, Jupiter, Saturn, Uranus, Neptune, Pluto)

obsolete (per the IAU definition of planet):
Most Vegetables Eat More Juice So Usually Never Pee 
My Very Educated Mother Just Served Us Nine Potatoes
Many Vicious Elephants Met Just Slightly Under New Pineapples
My Very Easy Method Just Speeds Up Naming Planets
Mark's Very Extravagant Mother Just Sent Us Ninety Parakeets
 Stellar classification sequence: O B A F G K M R N S
Oh Be A Fine Girl/Guy, Kiss Me Right Now, Sweetheart!

Revised stellar classification sequence: O B A F G K M L T Y 
Old, Bald, And Fat Generals Kiss More Ladies Than You

Signs of the zodiac:
{|
||(Aries,||Taurus,||Gemini,||Cancer,||Leo,||Virgo,||Libra,
|Scorpio,||Sagittarius,||Capricorn,||Aquarius,||Pisces)
|-
|  A||Tense||Grey||Cat||Lays|| Very||Low,
|Sneaking||Slowly,||Contemplating||  A||Pounce.
|}
Average distances of the outer planets from the Sun in astronomical units approximate nice round numbers:
Jupiter: 5 AU,  Saturn: 10 AU,  Uranus: 20 AU,  Neptune: 30 AU,  Pluto: 40 AU

Biology

To remember the order of taxa in biology (Domain, Kingdom, Phylum, Class, Order, Family, Genus, Species, [Variety]):
"Dear King Philip Came Over For Good Soup" is often cited as a non-vulgar method for teaching students to memorize the taxonomic classification of system.  Other variations tend to start with the mythical king, with one author noting "The nonsense about King Philip, or some ribald version of it, has been memorized by generations of biology students".
Dear King Philip Claps Often For Good Science
Dark King Prawns Curl Over Fresh Green Salad
Do Kings Play Chess On Fine Green Silk?
Dumb Kids Prefer Cheese Over Fried Greasy Spinach 
Do Kindly Place Cover On Fresh Green Spring Vegetables
Darn Kernel Panics Crash Our Family Game System
Do Keep Pond Clean Or Frog Gets Sick
Dumb Kids Play Catch Over Father's Grave Stone
Daniel Keeps Philip Cat On Friday Getting Salsa
 To remember the processes that define living things:
 MRS GREN: Movement; Respiration; Sensation; Growth; Reproduction; Excretion; Nutrition
 To remember the number of humps on types of camels:
 D in Dromedary has one hump; B in Bactrian has two

To recognize poison ivy
Leaves of three, leave it be.
COWS stand for Cold Opposite Warm Same, which are the relation between the components of the Caloric reflex test

Chemistry

To recall the names of the first 20 elements in the periodic table:
Harry, he likes beer by cupfuls, not over frothy, never nasty mugs allowed. Since past six closing, are kegs cancelled?

(H, He, Li, Be, B, C, N, O, F, Ne, Na, Mg, Al, Si, P, S, Cl, Ar, K, Ca.)

To remember the different charges of the anode and cathode in electrolysis (PANIC):
Positive
Anode
Negative
Is
Cathode

AN OIL RIG CAT:
 At the ANode, Oxidation Involves electron Loss.
 Reduction Involves electron Gain at the CAThode.

Engineering

For the EIA electronic color code, Black(0), Brown(1), Red(2), Orange(3), Yellow(4), Green(5), Blue(6), Violet(7), Gray(8), White(9), Gold(5%), Silver(10%), None(20%)

Big brown rabbits often yield great big vocal groans when gingerly slapped
Bad boys run our young girls behind victory garden walls
B .B Roy [of] Great Britain [has] Very Good Wife.
A mnemonic to remember which way to turn common (right-hand thread) screws and nuts, including light bulbs, is "Righty-tighty, Lefty-loosey"; another is "Right on, Left off".
 For the OSI Network Layer model Please Do Not Throw Sausage Pizza Away correspond to the Physical, Datalink, Network, Transport, Session, Presentation and Application layers. 
For power in watts: Twinkle twinkle little star, Power equals I squared R.

Geography
Both names of the northern major circles of latitude (the Arctic Circle and Tropic of Cancer) have six letters; both southern ones (the Antarctic Circle and Tropic of Capricorn) have nine.
The countries of South America in order of largest to smallest by area: Brazil, Argentina, Peru, Colombia, Bolivia, Venezuela, Chile, Paraguay, Ecuador, Guyana, Uruguay, Suriname
Boring, Average Politics Can Become Very Corrupt. People Everywhere Get Used Sometimes

The countries of Central America from North to South: Belize, Guatemala, El Salvador, Honduras, Nicaragua, Costa Rica, Panama
Big Gorillas Eat Hotdogs, Not Cold Pizza
Including Mexico, My Grandma Bunny Eats Hamburgers, Not Canned Peas

The Great Lakes in order of largest to smallest: Superior, Huron, Michigan, Erie, Ontario
Super Heroes Must Eat Oats
Or just to remember them at all
Huron Ontario Michigan Erie Superior: HOMES

The principal factors affecting climate: LABDOWA
Latitude, Altitude, Build, Distance from the sea, Ocean currents, Wind, Aspect

 The countries bordering Germany (clockwise from top): Denmark, Poland, Czechia, Austria, Switzerland, France, Luxembourg, Belgium, Netherlands.
 Do Polish Checks Always Say" France Look Back Now"!

Geology
Geological periods: Precambrian, Cambrian, Ordovician, Silurian, Devonian, Carboniferous, Permian, Triassic, Jurassic, Cretaceous, Paleocene, Eocene, Oligocene, Miocene, Pliocene, Pleistocene, Recent (Holocene)
Pregnant Camels Often Sit Down Carefully, Perhaps Their Joints Creak? Possibly Early Oiling Might Prevent Permanent Rheumatism
Paleozoic to Cenozoic: Pregnant Camels Ordinarily Sit Down Carefully, Perhaps Their Joints Creak

Mohs scale of mineral hardness 1-10:
For Talc(=1), Gypsum(=2), Calcite(=3), Fluorite(=4), Apatite(=5), Orthoclase(=6), Quartz(=7), Topaz(=8), Corundum(=9), Diamond(=10)
Tall Girls Can Fight And Other Queer Things Can Develop
TAll GYroscopes CAn FLy APart ORbiting QUickly TO COmplete DIsintegration
Toronto Girls Can Flirt And Only Quit To Chase Dwarves 
Terrible Giants Can Find Alligators Or Quaint Trolls Conveniently Digestible
Tall Gene Calls Florence At Our Quarters To Correct DumbnessDifferentiating stalactites from stalagmites.
The  'mites  go up and the  'tites  come down. When one has ants in one's pants, the mites go up and the tights come down. (In a strict scientific sense, a mite is not an ant, although "mite" in common speech can refer to any small creature.)
Stalactites hang tight, hang down like tights on a line; stalagmites might bite (if you sit on them), might reach the roof.
Tights hang from the Ceiling, and Mites crawl around on the Ground
You need might to do push-ups (from the floor). You must hold tight doing chin-ups (off the ceiling).
Stalactites are on the ceiling. Stalagmites are on the ground.
Stalactites cling tight to the ceiling; stalagmites might reach the ceiling.

History
Chinese dynasties (simplified): Xia (Hsia), Shang, Zhou (Chou), Qin (Ch'in), Han, Jin, Southern and Northern, Sui, Tang, Song, Yuan, Ming, Qing (Ching)
She Shamefully Chose Chinese Hand Jingles (and) SiNfully Sweet Tango Songs: "You (and) Me, Chickadee!"

English dynasties (simplified): Norman, Plantagenet, Lancaster, York, Tudor, Stuart, Hanover, Windsor
No Plan Like Yours To Study History Wisely.

Wives of Henry VIII (names): Aragon, Boleyn, Seymour, Cleves, Howard, Parr
All Boys Should Come Home Please
Wives of Henry VIII (manner of death): Divorced, beheaded, died / Divorced, beheaded, survived.
British nobility rank order (simplified): Duke, Marquess, Earl, Viscount, Barons
Do Men Ever Visit Boston?

Assassinated US presidents and perpetrators: Lincoln by Booth, Garfield by Guiteau, McKinley by Czolgosz and Kennedy by Oswald.
Losers Bearing Grudges Grieve Mainly Cowards Killing Orators

Languages

Characteristic sequence of letters
I always comes before E (but after C, E comes before I)
In most words like friend, field, piece, pierce, mischief, thief, tier, it is "i" which comes before "e". But on some words with c just before the pair of e and i, like receive, perceive,  "e" comes before "i". This can be remembered by the following mnemonic,

I before E, except after C

But this is not always obeyed as in case of weird and weigh, weight, height, neighbor etc. and can be remembered by extending that mnemonic as given belowI before E, except after COr when sounded "A" as in neighbor, weigh and weightOr when sounded like "eye" as in heightAnd "weird" is just weirdAnother variant, which avoids confusion when the two letters represent different sounds instead of a single sound, as in atheist or being, runs

When it says ee
Put i before e
But not after c

Where ever there is a Q there is a U too
Most frequently u follows q. e.g.: Que, queen, question, quack, quark, quartz, quarry, quit, Pique, torque, macaque, exchequer. Hence the mnemonic:Where ever there is a Q there is a U too (But this is violated by some words; see:List of English words containing Q not followed by U)

Letters of specific syllables in a word
BELIEVE
Do not believe a lie.
SECRETARY
A secretary must keep a secret
TEACHER
There is an ache in every teacher.
MEASUREMENT
Be sure of your measurements before you start work.
FRIENDFri the end of your friendSPECIAL
The CIA have special agentsBEAUTIFULBig Elephants Are Ugly
SEPARATE
Always smell a rat when you spell separate
There was a farmer named Sep and one day his wife saw a rat. She yelled, “Sep! A rat – E!!!”
CEMETERY
There are three "e"s buried in "cemetery".
PRINCIPALThe principal is your pal.

Distinguishing between similar words
Difference between Advice & Advise, Practice & Practise, Licence & License etc.
Advice, Practice, Licence etc. (those with c) are nouns and Advise, Practise, License etc. are verbs.
One way of remembering this is that the word ‘noun’ comes before the word ‘verb’ in the dictionary; likewise ‘c’ comes before ‘s’, so the nouns are ‘practice, licence, advice’ and the verbs are ‘practise, license, advise’.

Here or HearWe hear with our ear.

Complement and Compliment
complement adds something to make it enough
compliment puts you in the limelight

Principle and Principal
Your principal is your palA rule can be called a principleRemedial and Menial 
Remedial work is meant to remedy.
Menial work is boring but it's mean (-ial) to complain.

Their, There and They're
Theirs is not mine even though 'I' is in it.
There is where we'll be.
They're is a contraction of 'they are.'

Stationary and stationery
Stationery contains er and so does paper; stationary (not moving) contains ar and so does carA for "at rest", e for envelope

Gray and  grey
Gray is preferred in America while grey is preferred in England

First letter mnemonics of spelling
DIARRH(O)EADashing In A Rush, Running Harder (or) Else Accident!Dining In A Rough Restaurant: Hurry, (otherwise)Expect Accidents!Diarrhea Is A Really Runny Heap (of) Endless Amounts
ARITHMETICA Rat In The House May Eat The Ice Cream

NECESSARYNot Every Cat Eats Sardines (Some Are Really Yummy)Never Eat Chocolate, Eat Sardine Sandwiches And Remain Young
BECAUSEBig Elephants Can Always Understand Small ElephantsBig Elephants Cause Accidents  Under Small ElephantsBig Elephants Can't Always Use Small ExitsBig Elephants Can’t Always Use Small Entrances
MNEMONICSMnemonics Now Erase Man's Oldest Nemesis, Insufficient Cerebral Storage
GEOGRAPHYGeorge's Elderly Old Grandfather Rode A Pig Home Yesterday.
TOMORROWTrails Of My Old Red Rose Over Window

RHYTHMRhythm Helps Your Two Hips Move

Grammar
 Adjective order in English: OSASCOMP (Opinion, Size, Age, Shape, Color, Origin, Material, Purpose)On Saturday And Sunday Cold Ovens Make Pastry
 Commonly-used coordinating conjunctions in English: FANBOYSFor, And, Nor, But, Or, Yet, So
The verbs in French that use the auxiliary verb être in the compound past (sometimes called "verbs of motion") can be memorized using the phrase "Dr. (and) Mrs. Vandertramp":

devenir, revenir, monter, rester, sortir, venir, aller, naître, descendre, entrer, rentrer, tomber, retourner, arriver, mourir, partir

Mathematics

Pi
The first 15 numbers of Pi can be remembered by counting the letters in the phrase, How I want a drink, alcoholic of course, after the heavy lectures involving quantum mechanics

Quadratic equation
The articulation of the quadratic equation can be sung to the tune of various songs as a mnemonic device.

Mathematical operations
For helping students in remembering the rules in adding and multiplying two signed numbers, Balbuena and Buayan (2015) made the letter strategies LAUS (like signs, add; unlike signs, subtract) and LPUN (like signs, positive; unlike signs, negative), respectively.Order of OperationsPEMDASPlease - ParenthesisExcuse - ExponentsMy - MultiplicationDear - DivisionAunt - AdditionSally - Subtraction
(In the UK, the phrase BIDMAS is used instead; Brackets, Indices, Division, Multiplication, Addition, Subtraction.)

 Trigonometry 
The mnemonic "SOHCAHTOA" (occasionally spelt "SOH CAH TOA") is often used to remember the basic trigonometric functions:

 Sine = Opposite / Hypotenuse
 Cosine = Adjacent / Hypotenuse
 Tangent = Opposite / Adjacent

Other mnemonics that have been used for this include:Some Old HippieCaught Another HippieTripping On Acid.Ships Of Holland Call At Harwich To Obtain Apples.Sighs Of Happiness Come After Having Tankards Of Ale.Some Old Hen Caught Another Hen Taking Off Alone.Silly Old Hitler Can't Advance His Troops On Africa.

 Topology 
Mnemonics for Euler's characteristic are "fav.&hairsp;me", for "F  add V, minus E ", and "veryfun".

 Calculus 
The mnemonic "LIATE" is commonly used to determine which functions are to be chosen as u and DV in integration by parts.
 Logarithmic functions
 Inverse trigonometric functions
 Algebraic functions
 Trigonometric functions
 Exponential functions

Medicine

To remember the signs of a stroke:
 FAST Face (Has the victim's face fallen on one side?)
 Arms (Can the victim raise both arms and keep them raised?)
 Speech (Is the victim's speech slurred? Can they repeat a simple sentence?)
 Time (It is time to contact emergency services.)
To remember the steps for Resuscitation:
 D.R.S. A.B.C.D Danger (Check for danger to yourself or others before starting)
 Response (Check for signs of life or response)
 Send for help (Call for backup, or Emergency services)
 Airway (Check for obstruction in the throat)
 Breaths (Check for breaths)
 CPR (Commence CPR)
 Defib (Apply Defibrillator)

Anatomy

To remember the 10 organ systems of the human body:
 NICER DRUMS (Nervous, Integumentary, Circulatory, Endocrine, Respiratory, Digestive, Reproductive, Urinary, Muscular, Skeletal)
Intrinsic muscles of hand
'A OF A OF A'Thenar  (lateral to medial-palmar surface):
 Abductor pollicis brevis
     Opponens pollicis
     Flexor pollicis brevis
     Adductor pollicis
Hypothenar  (lateral to medial-palmar surface):

 Opponens digiti minimi
     Flexor digiti minimi
     Abductor digiti minimi

Muscles of mandibular nerve (V3 of trigeminal nerve) : Mylohyoid, Tensor tympani + Tensor veli palatini, Digastric (Anterior) – 4 Muscles of Mastication (temporalis, masseter, medial and lateral pterygoids

 My Tensors Dig Ants for Mom
 2 big ones, 2 small ones, 2 tensors, 2 pterygoids 

Bones of the wrist:Scaphoid bone, Lunate bone, Triquetral bone, Pisiform bone, Trapezium (bone), Trapezoid bone, Capitate bone & Hamate bone
 Some Lovers Try Positions That They Can't Handle
 She Looks Too Pretty Try To Catch Her
 So Long To Pinky, Here Comes The Thumb
 Simply Learn The Positions That The Carpus Has
 Send Louis To Paris To Tame Carnal Hungers
 Stop Letting Those People Touch The Cadaver's Hands

Differential Diagnosis
VINDICATE

Cranial nerves

Music

 Bowed strings 

 Mnemonics are used in remembering string names in violin standard tuning.
 Good Dogs Always Eat
 Greedy Dogs Always Eat
 Mnemonics are used in remembering string names in viola standard tuning.
 Cats Give Dogs Advice

Guitar

Mnemonics are used in remembering guitar string names in standard tuning.Every Average Dude Gets Better EventuallyEggs Are Deliciously Good Breakfast EnergyEddy Ate Dynamite Good  Bye EddyEvery Adult Dog Growls Barks Eats.Every Acid Dealer Gets Busted EventuallyEven After Dinner Giant Boys EatElephants All Dine Generally Before EightElephants And Donkeys Grow Big EarsEvery American Dog Gets Bones EasilyEvery Angel Does Good Before EvilEat All Day Get Big EasyEine Alte Dame Geht Heute Einkaufen (German: an old lady goes shopping today)Een Aap Die Geen Bananen Eet (Dutch: A monkey that doesn't eat bananas)
Thus we get the names of the strings from 6th string to the 1st string in that order.

Conversely, a mnemonic listing the strings in the reverse order is:Every Beginning Guitarist Does All Exercises!Elvis' Big Great Dane Ate EverythingEvery Big Girl Deserves An ElephantEaster Bunny Gets Drunk At EasterEaster Bunnies Go Dancing After Easter

Ukulele
As for guitar tuning, there is also a mnemonic for ukuleles. Good Cooks Eat A-lot

In the other direction it is Aunt Evy Cooks Grits

Reading music

 Musicians can remember the notes associated with the five lines of the treble clef using any of the following mnemonics, EGBDF: (from the bottom line to the top)

 Every Good Boy Does Fine.
 Every Good Boy Deserves Fudge (or Friendship, Fun, Fruit, etc.)
 Eggnog Gets Better During February Empty Garbage Before Dad FlipsThe four spaces of the treble clef spell out (from the bottom to the top) FACE and can be remembered as FACE fits in the space (between lines)
 The five lines of the bass clef from the bottom to the top Good Boys Do Fine Always Good Birds Don't Fly Away Grizzly Bears Don't Fly Airplanes Great Basses Dig Fine Altos Goblins Bring Death For All George Bush Didn't Find Anything Good Burritos Don't Fall Apart The four spaces of the bass clef from the bottom to the top All Cows Eat Grass All Cars Eat Gas The five lines of the alto clef from the bottom to the top Fat Alley Cat Eats Garbage The four spaces of the alto clef from the bottom to the top Green Birds Do Fly The order of sharps in key signature notation is F♯, C♯, G♯, D♯, A♯, E♯, B♯, which can be remembered using the phrase Father Charles Goes Down And Ends Battle Father Christmas Gave Dad An Electric Blanket. Fat Cats Go Down Alleys Eating Birds. Fidel Castro Gets Drunk And Eats Babies. Fat Cats Greedy Dogs All Eat Bananas. The order of flats is B♭, E♭, A♭, D♭, G♭, C♭, and F♭ (reverse order of sharps), which can be remembered using the phrase: Battle Ends And Down Goes Charles' Father Blanket Exploded And Dad Got Cold Feet. Before Eating A Doughnut Get Coffee First. To remember the difference between the whole rest and the half rest:       
 A whole rest looks like a "hole in the ground", and a half rest looks like a hat.

Philosophy
THE LAD ZAPPA is a mnemonic for the first 11 (and most important) Ionian philosophers: Thales, Heraclitus, Empedocles, Leucippus, Anaximander, Democritus, Zeno, Anaximenes, Protagoras, Parmenides, Anaxagoras .
THE PLAZA PAD is another mnemonic for the first 11 (and most important) Ionian philosophers: Thales, Heraclitus, Empedocles, Protagoras, Leucippus, Anaximander, Zeno, Anaximenes, Parmenides, Anaxagoras, Democritus.
SPA is a mnemonic for the philosophers Socrates, Plato, and Aristotle in their order of appearance, Socrates first.

Physics

Sequence of colors in a rainbow or visible spectrum (red, orange, yellow, green, blue, indigo, violet):
 "Richard Of York Gave Battle In Vain"
 Roy G. Biv is also used as a fictitious name

Transportation
 Marine in the section "The coming in going out rule"
 "Red, Right, Return" reminds the skipper entering ("returning to") an IALA region B port to keep red markers to the starboard of the vessel.  Conversely the opposite convention exists in IALA region A ports, where a similar (but significantly different) mnemonic of "Red on the Right Returning To Sea" can be used.
The phrase "there's always some red port (wine) left" is used to remember the basics in seafaring. "Red" refers to the color of navigation lights on the port (left) side of a vessel (as opposed to green on the starboard side).
"Nuclear Restrictions Constrain Fishing and Sailing, People Say" is used to encode the "order of priority" for which vessels have right of way (earlier in the list has priority over later): Not under command; Restricted; Constrained by draft; Fishing vessel; Sailboat; Powerboat; Seaplane.

 Aviation uses many mnemonics in addition to written checklists. See also Category: Aviation mnemonics

CRAFT - Clearance limit, Route, Altitude, Frequency, Transponder.
pre-landing: GUMPS - Gas, Undercarriage, Mixture, Propeller, Speed.
 pre-final: MARTHA - Missed (procedure), Altitude (limit), Radios (set), Time (limit), Heading (final),  Airspeed (descent)
 pre-high-altitude - FLOWER - Flow (enabled), Lights (test), Oxygen (charged), Water (humidity), Electricity (on), Radio (check)
 pre-flight-paperwork - ARROW - Airworthiness (certificate), Registration, Required (charts), Operating (checklists), Weight and balance
 night collision avoidance: Red, Right, Returning - Red nav light on Right implies target is Returning (closing)
 radio loss Instrument course - CDEF - as Cleared, else Direct to last fix, else as directed to Expect, else as flight plan Filed
 spin recovery - POKER - Power (off), Opposite (full rudder), Klean (flaps, ...), Elevator (briskly forward), Recover (from dive)

Units of measure
Common SI prefixes:kilo-, hecto-, deca-, deci-, centi-, milli-, in descending order of magnitude:"Base" (Meters, liters, grams) come in between "deca" and "deci".Kangaroos Hop Down British Driveways Carrying M&Ms
King Henry Drank Both Diet Cokes Monday 
King Henry Died By Drinking Chocolate Milk deca-, hecto-, kilo-, mega-, giga-, tera-, in ascending order of magnitude:
Decadent Hector Killed Meg's Gigantic Terrierdeci-,-, milli-, micro-, nano-, pico-, femto-, atto-'' in descending order of magnitude:
Darn Clever Mnemonic Makes No Prefix Forgettable, Absolutely

See also
Mnemonic
List of firefighting mnemonics
List of visual mnemonics
Category: Science mnemonics

References

Further reading

External links
List of hundreds of mnemonics belonging to several topics
Medical mnemonics pdf (consisting of 22 pages full of) mnemonics on medical topics ordered alphabetically
Medical mnemonics
Searchable database of Medical mnemonics
Mnemonics generator for numbers
Collection of Mnemonics
Collection of Mnemonics by Category
Community website to collaborate and create new mnemonics

+
Psychology lists